The Forger is a 1928 British silent crime film directed by G. B. Samuelson and starring Nigel Barrie, Lillian Rich and James Raglan. It is based on the 1927 novel The Forger by Edgar Wallace. It was made at Southall Studios.

Cast
 Nigel Barrie as Doctor Cheyne Wells  
 Lillian Rich as Jane Leith
 James Raglan as Peter Clifton
 Winter Hall as John Leith
 Sam Livesey as Inspector Rouper
 Derrick de Marney as Basil Hale

See also
 The Forger of London (1961)

References

Bibliography
 Low, Rachel. The History of British Film: Volume IV, 1918–1929. Routledge, 1997.

External links
 

1928 films
British crime films
British silent feature films
Films directed by G. B. Samuelson
Films based on British novels
Films based on works by Edgar Wallace
Films shot at Southall Studios
British black-and-white films
Counterfeit money in film
Ideal Film Company films
1920s English-language films
1920s British films